Maxwell's black weaver (Ploceus albinucha) is a species of bird in the family Ploceidae.

Range
It is sparsely distributed across the African tropical rainforest.

References

Maxwell's black weaver
Birds of the African tropical rainforest
Maxwell's black weaver
Taxonomy articles created by Polbot